Stand Up is a 2019 Malayalam film directed by Vidhu Vincent. The film narrates the story of Keerthi (Nimisha Sajayan), an aspiring stand-up comedian, who is trying to find some opportunities for her shows amidst several difficulties.

Cast

Plot 
The story revolves around Keerthi an aspiring Stand Up comedian who narrates the story of her friend Diya who was attacked in an apartment and is branded a victim.

Keerthi is at a stage where many stand-up comedians are presenting their act. She starts with the typical stand-up comedy and talks about her family. Her brother Amal and her friend Diya are in a relationship. However, there is always a friction between them as Amal considers Diya to be more fond of her friends. things go downhill at times. Amal convinces his mother to agree to their marriage and he meets Diya to convey the same. Diya tells him that she got admission in Delhi University and is going to pursue the same. Amal gets enraged because he had told Diya against it previously. Things get very bad and eventually they break up but Amal is still not willing to let go. Sujith gets Diya to his flat for a final talk. Amal tells Sujith off and begins to talk to Diya angrily. He assaults her and leaves her unconscious. Sujith gets framed for the rape and there is immense pressure on Diya to back off from legal proceedings. Keerthi is forced to leave her home for supporting Diya. How they finally get justice for Diya forms the rest of the movie.

Reception 
Times of India said that the film is "A brave female perspective on addressing abuse" and rated it 3.5 out of 5.

References 

2019 films
2010s Malayalam-language films
Indian drama films
2019 drama films